Alan Soutar (born 10 January 1978) is a Scottish professional darts player who competes in the Professional Darts Corporation. He qualified for the 2011 and 2016 BDO World Darts Championship and won a PDC Tour Card in 2021.

Personal life
Away from darts, Soutar is a firefighter in Dundee as well as training guide dogs in his home with partner Amanda.

Soutar is a keen supporter of his local football team Arbroath F.C.

Career

BDO
In November 2011 Alan won the Bellrock Open. He qualified for the 2011 BDO World Darts Championship, he played Willy van de Wiel in the first round and lost 3–1 in sets. In 2013 he won the 2013 WDF World Cup as part of Team Scotland. He qualified for the 2016 BDO World Darts Championship through the Hull qualifiers before losing to Craig Caldwell in the preliminary round.

PDC
In February 2021, Soutar secured a two-year PDC Tour Card at UK Qualifying School. Soutar made his televised PDC debut with a first round defeat of Raymond van Barneveld in the 2021 UK Open before falling to Dave Chisnall in the last 16.

In December 2021, Soutar made his debut at the PDC World Championship, where he defeated Diogo Portela in the first round in the deciding set. In the following two rounds, Soutar knocked out two seeds, Mensur Suljović and José de Sousa, each time in the deciding set having survived match darts from his opponent. Soutar's run to the last 16 was finally ended by Callan Rydz in a 1–4 defeat.

In 2022, Soutar made his debut as a qualifier for the Grand Slam of Darts, where he advanced from his group ahead of reigning World Champion Peter Wright after victories over Fallon Sherrock and Nathan Aspinall. In the Round of 16, Soutar defeated ninth-ranked Jonny Clayton to reach the Quarter Final where he was defeated by eventual runner-up Nathan Aspinall.

World Championship results

BDO
 2011: First round (lost to Willy van de Wiel 1–3)
 2016: Preliminary round (lost to Craig Caldwell 1–3)

PDC
 2022: Fourth round (lost to Callan Rydz 1–4)
 2023: Fourth round (lost to Gabriel Clemens 1–4)

Performance timeline 

PDC European Tour

(W) Won; (F) finalist; (SF) semifinalist; (QF) quarterfinalist; (#R) rounds 6, 5, 4, 3, 2, 1; (RR) round-robin stage; (Prel.) Preliminary round; (DNQ) Did not qualify; (DNP) Did not participate; (NH) Not held; (EX) Excluded; (WD) Withdrew

References

External links

1978 births
Living people
Scottish darts players
British Darts Organisation players
Professional Darts Corporation current tour card holders